PureOS is a Linux distribution focusing on privacy and security, using the GNOME desktop environment. It is maintained by Purism for use in the company's Librem laptop computers as well as the Librem 5 smartphone.

PureOS is designed to include only free software, and is included in the list of Free Linux distributions published by the Free Software Foundation.

PureOS is a Debian-based Linux distribution, merging open-source software packages from the Debian “testing” main archive using a hybrid point release and rolling release model. The default web browser in PureOS is called PureBrowser, a variant of GNOME Web focusing on privacy. The default search engine in PureBrowser is DuckDuckGo.

See also

 GNU Free System Distribution Guidelines
 List of Linux distributions based on Debian testing 
branch

References

External links
 
 

ARM operating systems
Debian-based distributions
Free mobile software
Free software only Linux distributions
GNOME Mobile
Linux distributions
Mobile Linux
Mobile operating systems
Mobile/desktop convergence
Rolling Release Linux distributions